Knut Lundstrøm (17 February 1951) is a retired Norwegian Paralympic cross-country skier and ice sledge speed racer. He is amongst the most successful Paralympians of all time having won 14 gold medals, 5 silvers, and 2 bronzes. He attended four Games between 1988 and 1998, competing in cross country skiing and ice sledge speed racing events.

References

Living people
1951 births
Medalists at the 1988 Winter Paralympics
Medalists at the 1992 Winter Paralympics
Medalists at the 1994 Winter Paralympics
Medalists at the 1998 Winter Paralympics
Paralympic gold medalists for Norway
Paralympic silver medalists for Norway
Paralympic bronze medalists for Norway
Paralympic cross-country skiers of Norway
Cross-country skiers at the 1988 Winter Paralympics
Cross-country skiers at the 1992 Winter Paralympics
Cross-country skiers at the 1994 Winter Paralympics
Ice sledge speed racers at the 1988 Winter Paralympics
Ice sledge speed racers at the 1994 Winter Paralympics
Ice sledge speed racers at the 1998 Winter Paralympics
Paralympic ice sledge speed racers of Norway
Norwegian male cross-country skiers
Paralympic medalists in cross-country skiing